Radisson Royal Dubai is a skyscraper and hotel complex located in Dubai, United Arab Emirates. The 60 story building was completed in 2010, construction having started in 2005, and houses a Radisson hotel. The modernist concrete building is located on 26 Sheikh Zayed Road. The hotel contains 471 rooms, and is located close to Dubai International Airport, Dubai International Financial Center, and Dubai World Trade Center.

See also
Skyscraper design and construction
List of tallest hotels in the world

References

Buildings and structures in Dubai
Hotel buildings completed in 2010
Hotels established in 2010
Hotels in Dubai